Bart van Hintum (born 16 January 1987) is a Dutch professional footballer who plays as a left-back for Eerste Divisie club PEC Zwolle.

Career
Van Hintum started playing in the youth department of FC Schadewijk before joining youth teams of PSV and later TOP Oss. In 2005, he was promoted to the first team of second division club TOP Oss. In his first season with the team, he made his professional debut and finished the season with a single league appearance. Afterwards, he established himself as a starter during the 2006–07 season, which he maintained until the summer of 2010. That summer, his club, which had at that point been renamed FC Oss, suffered relegation to the third tier.

After the relegation, van Hintum left his hometown club and continued his career at the second-tier club FC Dordrecht. A season later, he moved again within the league and this time signed with PEC Zwolle. With this club he won the 2011–12 Eerste Divisie, and thus secured promotion to the Eredivisie. In the 2013–14 season, van Hintum and Zwolle won the KNVB Cup, the Dutch national cup tournament, for the first time in club history. With this win, Zwolle qualified for the Johan Cruyff Shield, the Dutch Supercup, in summer 2014. This was also won, as Zwolle beat defending Dutch champions Ajax 1–0 and also won this trophy for the first time in the club's history.

Before the 2016–17 season, van Hintum moved to Turkish Süper Lig club Gaziantepspor. He suffered relegation with the club during his sole season there, and moved to Heracles Almelo afterwards. Two years later, he moved to FC Groningen.

On 5 April 2022, it was announced that van Hintum would return to PEC Zwolle for the 2022–23 season. He signed a one-year contract with an option for an additional year.

Honours
PEC Zwolle
KNVB Cup: 2013–14
Johan Cruijff Shield: 2014
Eerste Divisie: 2011–12

References

External links
 
 Voetbal International profile 

1987 births
Living people
Sportspeople from Oss
Association football fullbacks
Dutch footballers
Dutch expatriate footballers
PSV Eindhoven players
TOP Oss players
FC Dordrecht players
PEC Zwolle players
Gaziantepspor footballers
Heracles Almelo players
FC Groningen players
Eredivisie players
Eerste Divisie players
Süper Lig players
Expatriate footballers in Turkey
Dutch expatriate sportspeople in Turkey
Footballers from North Brabant